Astrocystis is a genus of fungi in the family Xylariaceae.

References

External links
Index Fungorum

Xylariales
Taxa named by Miles Joseph Berkeley
Taxa named by Christopher Edmund Broome